Starbeck is a railway station on the Harrogate Line, which runs between  and  via . It is owned by Network Rail and managed by Northern Trains.

Background
The station dates from 1 September 1848 and was the first to serve Harrogate. Initially, intending passengers had to make the  connection from the town on foot or by horse bus, as the Leeds and Thirsk Railway had elected to take an easily graded route to the east, rather than cross the Crimple Valley and serve the town itself.

The line on to Ripon and Thirsk was opened the following July, with a further line to Knaresborough and York opened by the East and West Yorkshire Junction Railway on 1 October 1851. However, it was not until both companies had been absorbed by the North Eastern Railway some years later that the issue of a link into the centre of Harrogate was addressed, with a route via Dragon Junction to a new central station (and on via Crimple Valley Viaduct to Pannal Junction) being commissioned on 1 August 1862. This new loop soon became the preferred route for most through traffic between Leeds and Teesside, leaving Starbeck to be served primarily by York trains although some freight and excursion traffic continued to use the original L&T line for many years.

Services on the old line to Pannal ended in October 1951, whilst the Leeds Northern main line to Ripon and Northallerton was closed to passengers in March 1967 and completely two years later.

The station at one time had canopies and substantial buildings, but these have been demolished. The signal box remains in use to supervise a busy level crossing.

There are proposals to create another station between Starbeck and Harrogate at Bilton.

Facilities
The station is unstaffed, but has ticket machines available. Shelters, timetable information boards and digital information screens are located on each platform – these are linked by a subway with ramps, so both have step-free access. Running information is also offered by means of automatic P.A announcements.

Services

As of the May 2021 timetable change, the station is served by two trains per hour between Leeds and Knaresborough, with one train per hour extending to York. Additional services operate at peak times. During the evening and on Sunday, an hourly service operates between Leeds and York. All services are operated by Northern Trains.

Rolling stock used: Class 158 Express Sprinter and Class 170 Turbostar

References

Sources

Body, G. (1988), PSL Field Guides - Railways of the Eastern Region Volume 2, Patrick Stephens Ltd, Wellingborough,

External links
 
 

Railway stations in Harrogate
DfT Category F1 stations
Former York and North Midland Railway stations
Railway stations in Great Britain opened in 1848
Northern franchise railway stations
1848 establishments in England